CCLA may refer to:

 California Collegiate Lacrosse Association, a conference that participates in the Men's Collegiate Lacrosse Association
 Canadian Civil Liberties Association, a non-governmental organization in Canada
 Canadian Copyright Licensing Agency, a Canadian business corporation
 Chimpanzee–human last common ancestor, also CHLCA or C/H LCA
 Correspondence Chess League of America, the first American chess club to become an ICCF affiliate
 Correspondence Chess League of Australia, the league that organizes the Australian Correspondence Chess Championship